Wanda Kay Brown is an American librarian, and the president of the American Library Association for the 2019–2020 term. She is the director of the C. G. O'Kelly Library at Winston-Salem State University and a leader in state and national library associations. She is the first American Library Association president who is a library director at one of the nation's historically black colleges and universities.

Background and education
Brown, a native North Carolinian, received a Bachelor of Arts in English at Winston-Salem State University in May 1977 and a Master's degree in Library Science at the University of North Carolina at Greensboro in 1983. Her personal story as a chosen child and an example of a rise from adversity aired on WXII-12-Winston-Salem.

Career
Brown began working at Wake Forest University in 1977 as a library technician, eventually working her way up to  associate director of the Z. Smith Reynolds Library in 2007. Since 2016, she has served as Director of Library Services for the C. G. O'Kelly Library at Winston-Salem State University.

Brown has been a member of the American Library Association for 30 years. Brown has held multiple positions within the Black Caucus of the American Library Association (BCALA), including time spent as treasurer (1992–1996, 2016–2018), executive board member (2001–2003, 2014–2016), and president (2006–2008). From 2011 to 2013 she was the president of the North Carolina Library Association, with which she has also held the positions of treasurer (1991–1998) and chair of the finance committee (2005–2009).

ALA Presidency

Campaign
In early 2018, Brown received endorsement from BCALA, supported by a petition signed by 34 members in support of her running. Brown was elected president of the American Library Association for 2019–2020. Brown received 6,066 votes; her opponent, Peter Hepburn, head librarian at the College of the Canyons, Santa Clarita, CA, received 4,066 Votes.  The 11,037 ballots cast, representing approximately 22.1 percent of ALA membership, were up from the previous year's total of 9,748.  Brown is the first librarian from a historically black college or university to serve as ALA president.

Presidential Statements and Publications

As President of the American Library Association Brown writes a column for its magazine, American Libraries,  and has addressed the role of librarians promoting Association values, the redesign of libraries. and how libraries can help immigrants and refugees thrive with inclusive programs and services.

In 2020 Brown wrote "Forward Together: Charting a Path to a More Vibrant and Effective Organization," and presented recommendations to enable sustainable, long-term change for the American Library Association. On February 14, 2020 Brown and the Executive Board issued a statement regarding the Association's financial shortfall in the operating budget.

On January 15, 2020 Wanda Kay Brown announced the appointment of Tracie D. Hall as Executive Director of the American Library Association.

The role of librarians' intersection with the 2020 census was the topic of President Brown's March/April American Libraries column. She noted, "It's important to view this civic duty through the lens of social justice.  Hard-to-count groups include recent immigrants, people of color, young children, and renters."

Libraries' response to the COVID-19 pandemic was the topic of Wanda Kay Brown's presidential column in May, 2020, "Libraries Adapt amid Crisis: Finding inspiration from library workers across the country."  She highlighted homework help at the Charleston County Public Library in South Carolina, the My Librarian 30-minute appointments to assist patrons with navigating small business loans at the Public Library of Cincinnati and Hamilton County in Ohio, and the housing of homeless people at the Spokane Public Library in Washington. Brown concluded, "May these challenging and uncertain times find us working even closer together so that our libraries, our communities, our association, and our families will all thrive. "

In her final American Libraries essay as American Library Association president in June, 2020 President Brown reviewed her 2019-2020 year as one of change, loss, and hope.

On June 1, 2020 Wanda Kay Brown announced the endorsement the Black Caucus of the American Library Association, "Statement Condemning Increased Violence and Racism Towards Black Americans and People of Color"  by the American Library Association Executive Board.

#eBooksForAll
Under Brown's leadership the American Library Association launched the campaign #eBooksForAll denouncing Macmillan Publishers' planned embargo on eBook sales to libraries. The background on Macmillan's decision has been explained by Jessamyn West in a CNN opinion essay, "Libraries are fighting to preserve your right to borrow e-books".

2020 Annual Conference and COVID-19

Wanda Kay Brown was the first president in 75 years under whom the live Annual Conference, scheduled for Chicago in June 2020, was cancelled. The reason was the Coronavirus disease 2019 (COVID-19). "ALA's priority is the health and safety of the library community, including our members, staff, supporters, vendors and volunteers," Brown stated in a press release. "As the COVID-19 pandemic unfolds, it's become clear that in the face of an unprecedented situation, we need to make tough choices." 
The 2020 conference was reconfigured as a virtual event, Community Through Connection, on June 24–25, 2020. The  opening session features Misty Copeland and closing session features Natalie Portman.

Awards
Brown has been honored with the BCALA 2015 DEMCO/ALA Black Caucus Award for Excellence, the 2013 BCALA Leadership Award, and the 2012 BCALA Distinguished Service Award.

University of North Carolina at Greensboro awarded Brown the 2009 UNCG Kovacs Award for Outstanding Alumni Achievement and a 2013 UNCG School of Education Outstanding Alumni Achievement Award.

References 

African-American librarians
American librarians
Winston-Salem State University alumni
Presidents of the American Library Association
Year of birth missing (living people)
Living people
University of North Carolina at Greensboro alumni
Wake Forest University administrators
American women librarians
People from North Carolina
21st-century African-American people
21st-century African-American women